Rhizocarpon geographicum (the map lichen) is a species of lichen, which grows on rocks in mountainous areas of low air pollution. Each lichen is a flat patch bordered by a black line of fungal hyphae. These patches grow adjacent to each other, leading to the appearance of a map or a patchwork field.

When circular, or roughly circular, the diameter of this lichen species has been widely used to help determining the relative age of deposits, e.g. moraine systems, thus revealing evidence of glacial advances. The process is termed lichenometry. This technique is generally attributed to the work of Roland Beschel in the Alps.

Lichenometry is based on the assumption that the largest lichen growing on a rock is the oldest individual. Generally, the five largest lichen thalli diameters are taken, although several statistical methods have been used. If the growth rate is known, the maximum lichen size will give a minimum age for when this rock was deposited. The growth rate curve, a graph of age of a lichen against the date of the substrate on which it is found has to be constructed for an area. Beschel originally used gravestones to produce a calibration curve. Growth rates for different areas and species can be obtained by measuring maximum lichen sizes on substrates of known age, such as gravestones, historic or prehistoric rock buildings, or moraines of known age (e.g. those deposited during the Little Ice Age).

Distribution
This lichen species is broadly distributed and may be found in most cold areas with exposed rock surfaces. The North American range includes the Sierra Nevada<ref>Tracy Irwin Storer, Robert Leslie Usinger and David Lukas. 2004. Sierra Nevada Natural History, 2nd ed, University of California Press, 439 pages</ref> and northern Boreal forests of Canada, Greenland, Iceland, Fennoscandia and Siberia. In the tropics it only occurs at high altitudes such as the Andes of Peru and Colombia. Further south the map lichen is found broadly across Patagonia, in the Falkland Islands, the sub Antarctic islands and the Antarctic Peninsula.

In Britain it can be found commonly growing on hard siliceous rocks, especially in upland regions. Its range covers virtually all of Scotland, much of North West England, and other upland areas in much of the rest of England, Wales and Ireland too.

In Spain it is found primarily in siliceous mountain ranges, although occasionally it can be found near sea level, even in southern Spain, where it is known from Cabo de Gata.

EcologyRhizocarpon geographicum is a known host to the lichenicolous fungus species Muellerella pygmaea''.

Outer space
In an experiment, this lichen species was placed in a capsule and launched into space. The capsule was opened, exposing the lichen to space conditions for 10 days before being brought back down to Earth, where it showed minimal changes or damage.

See also
 Extremophile

References

Rhizocarpaceae
Lichen species
Lichens described in 1753
Lichens of Europe
Lichens of North America
Lichens of South America
Lichens of Iceland
Taxa named by Carl Linnaeus